The Mexicaltzingo railway station is part of the Guadalajara light rail system in the Mexican state of Jalisco.

Railway stations in Guadalajara
Guadalajara light rail system Line 1 stations
Railway stations located underground in Mexico
Railway stations opened in 1989